Veel Is a surname. Notable people with the surname include:

Edward Veel (1632–1708), English academic, ejected minister, and dissenting tutor
Robert Veel (died  1432), English politician

See also
 Viel (name)